Oftia is a genus of flowering plants belonging to the family Scrophulariaceae.

Its native range is South Africa.

Species
Species:

Oftia africana 
Oftia glabra 
Oftia revoluta

References

Scrophulariaceae
Scrophulariaceae genera